The Herrensee is a lake near the town of Strausberg, located in the Märkisch-Oderland district, Brandenburg, Germany.

Herrensee belongs to the Naturschutzgebiet Lange Dammwiesen und Unteres Annatal.

The lakes Bötzsee and Straussee are located nearby.

Gallery

References

External links

Strausberg
Lakes of Brandenburg